WOW Worship: Yellow is the 4th installment in the WOW Worship series.  Following the tradition of the WOW Worship series, it is a double-disc collection featuring 33 worship songs from today's artists.  It also includes 7 new songs exclusive to this release. The album reached #44 on the Billboard 200 chart.  The album was certified as platinum in 2003 by the Recording Industry Association of America (RIAA).

Track listing 
Disc 1
Michael W. Smith - Awesome God – 4:03
Rebecca St. James - Breathe – 3:57
Third Day, Caedmon's Call - God of Wonders – 5:10
Amy Grant - Imagine – 3:47
Caedmon's Call - Majesty – 4:07   **
Nichole Nordeman - You Are My All in All – 4:12   **
SONICFLOOd - I Could Sing of Your Love Forever – 4:54
Joy Williams - Hungry (Falling on My Knees) – 4:31   **
Chris Tomlin - Forever – 5:14
NewSong - You Are My King – 4:44
Darlene Zschech - I Give You My Heart – 6:32
Out of Eden - Every Move I Make – 4:16
Matt Redman - Let Everything That Has Breath – 4:18
Nicole C. Mullen - Redeemer – 4:56
4Him - Thy Word – 4:36   **
Rich Mullins - Step By Step – 2:27
Big Daddy Weave - Audience Of One – 5:24

Disc 2
Third Day - Your Love Oh Lord (Psalm 36) – 3:55
Mark Schultz - Shout To The Lord – 4:38   **
Jeff Deyo - More Love, More Power – 4:27
Tim Hughes - Here I Am To Worship – 5:15
Adrienne Liesching and Geoff Moore - In Christ Alone – 5:46
The Katinas - Draw Me Close – 5:17
Delirious? - The Happy Song – 4:31
FFH - Better Is One Day – 3:38   **
Phillips, Craig and Dean - Come, Now is the Time to Worship – 3:58
Passion - The Heart of Worship – 6:06
Chris Tomlin - The Wonderful Cross – 7:07
Twila Paris - He Is Exalted – 3:45
Jars of Clay - Be Thou My Vision – 4:15   **
Keith Green - Oh Lord, You're Beautiful – 4:22
GlassByrd - I Stand Amazed – 3:59
David Crowder Band - Our Love Is Loud – 4:48

Notes
  **  These seven songs were newly recorded specifically for this release.

References

[ Review] at Allmusic.  Retrieved on March 21, 2007.
Review at Amazon.com.  Retrieved on March 21, 2007.

2003 compilation albums
WOW series albums